Andreacarus is a genus of mites in the family Laelapidae that are parasitic on small mammals and earwigs in Africa and Madagascar. A number of Australian and New Guinean species were formerly included in the genus, but are now placed in a separate genus Juxtalaelaps.

The genus includes the following species:
 Andreacarus brachyuromys Dowling et al., 2007 (on the rodent Brachyuromys in Madagascar)
 Andreacarus eliurus Dowling et al., 2007 (on the rodent Eliurus in Madagascar)
 Andreacarus galidia Dowling et al., 2007 (on the carnivoran Galidia in Madagascar)
 Andreacarus gymnuromys Dowling et al., 2007 (on the rodent Gymnuromys in Madagascar)
 Andreacarus hemicentetes Fain, 1991 (on the tenrec Hemicentetes in Madagascar)
 Andreacarus matthyssei Fain, 1991 (on the rodent Cricetomys in Nigeria)
 Andreacarus petersi Radford, 1953 (on the rodents Cricetomys, Arvicanthis, and Mastomys and the earwig Hemimerus in mainland Africa)
 Andreacarus nesomys Dowling et al., 2007 (on the rodent Nesomys in Madagascar)
 Andreacarus tenrec Dowling et al., 2007 (on the tenrec Tenrec in Madagascar)
 Andreacarus voalavo Dowling et al., 2007 (on the rodent Voalavo in Madagascar)
 Andreacarus zumpti Taufflieb, 1956 (on Cricetomys in mainland Africa)

References

Laelapidae
Acari genera